Constantinos "Con" Blatsis (born 6 July 1977) is a former Australian international association footballer who played as a defender.

Club career
Blatsis was born in Melbourne. He started his career at his home club South Melbourne making 104 league appearances before moving to English Premier League side Derby County in the summer of 2000. He subsequently joined First Division Sheffield Wednesday on loan making six appearances. After making only two appearances for Derby he was released and in March 2002 joined Division Two side Colchester United on a short-term deal. He made seven appearances for the club becoming a fan favorite in the process. However, he left the club at the end of the season. He then joined Turkish team Kocaelispor, where he played until he left the club for financial reasons during his second season. A brief move to Irish club St Patrick's Athletic followed, but after only two cup appearances he left in May 2004. After unsuccessful trials with Coventry City and FC Twente, he returned to his first club, South Melbourne in early 2005. He stayed at the club until he retired in 2009 after a series of injuries.

International career
He played for the Australian Under-20 and Under-23 sides before earning two senior caps and a place in the squad for the 2000 Summer Olympics.

Career statistics

Club

International

Honours

Club
South Melbourne
 Oceania Club Championship: 1999
 National Soccer League Championship: 1997–98, 1998–99
 National Soccer League Premiership: 1997–98
 NSL Cup: 1995–96
 Victorian Premier League: 2006

International
Australia
 OFC U-20 Championship: 1997

References

External links
 OzFootball profile

Living people
1977 births
Association football defenders
Soccer players from Melbourne
Australian people of Greek descent
Australian expatriate soccer players
Australia international soccer players
Australian expatriate sportspeople in England
Australian expatriate sportspeople in Turkey
Footballers at the 2000 Summer Olympics
Olympic soccer players of Australia
South Melbourne FC players
Derby County F.C. players
Sheffield Wednesday F.C. players
Colchester United F.C. players
Kocaelispor footballers
Premier League players
English Football League players
National Soccer League (Australia) players
Expatriate footballers in England
Expatriate footballers in Turkey
Australian Institute of Sport soccer players
Australian soccer players
St Patrick's Athletic F.C. players
League of Ireland players
Expatriate association footballers in the Republic of Ireland
Australian expatriate sportspeople in Ireland